This is a list of the stories in Richard Francis Burton's translation of One Thousand and One Nights. Burton's first ten volumes—which he called The Book of the Thousand Nights and a Night—were published in 1885.  His Supplemental Nights were published between 1886 and 1888 as six volumes.  Later pirate copies split the very large third volume into two volumes. The nights are in the style of stories within stories, and the frame story is The Story Of King Shahryar of Persia and His Brother or The Story Of King Shahryar and Queen Shahrazad, in which Shahrazad tells tales to her husband Shahryar.

NOTE: The stories in this collection contains both Sunni and Shi'ite stories and does not follow a specific timeline or chronology. The numbers in parentheses indicate that the night in question began (and the previous night ended) during the tale indicated (or one of its sub-tales). Numbers in double parentheses mean that the story is fully contained in the indicated night. An asterisk indicates the story begins with the night.

Volume 1
Story of King Shahryar and His Brother (1–1001)
-Tale of the Bull and the Ass (Told by the Vizier) (0)
Tale of the Trader and the Jinn (1–3)
The First Shaykh's Story (1-2)
The Second Shaykh's Story ((2))
The Third Shaykh's Story (2-3)
Tale of the Fisherman and the Jinni (3–9)
Tale of the Vizier and the Sage Duban (5)
Story of King Sindibad and His Falcon ((5))
Tale of the Husband and the Parrot ((5))
Tale of the Prince and the Ogress (5-7)
Tale of the Ensorcelled Prince (7-8)
The Porter and the Three Ladies of Baghdad (9–19)
The First Kalandar's Tale (11-12)
The Second Kalandar's Tale (12–14)
Tale of the Envier and the Envied ((14))
The Third Kalandar's Tale (14–17)
The Eldest Lady's Tale (17-18)
Tale of the Portress ((18))
The Tale of the Three Apples (19–24)
Tale of Núr al-Dín Alí and his Son (20–24)
The Hunchback's Tale (24–34)
The Nazarene Broker's Story (25-26)
The Reeve's Tale (27-28)
Tale of the Jewish Doctor (28-29)
Tale of the Tailor (29–33)
The Barber's Tale of Himself (31–33)
The Barber's Tale of his First Brother ((31))
The Barber's Tale of his Second Brother (31-32)
The Barber's Tale of his Third Brother ((32))
The Barber's Tale of his Fourth Brother ((32))
The Barber's Tale of his Fifth Brother (32-33)
The Barber's Tale of his Sixth Brother ((33))
The End of the Tailor's Tale (33-34)

Volume 2
Nur al-Din Ali and the Damsel Anis Al-Jalis (34–38)
Tale of Ghanim bin Ayyub, The Distraught, The Thrall o' Love (39–45)
Tale of the First Eunuch, Bukhayt ((39))
Tale of the Second Eunuch, Kafur (40)
The Tale of King Omar bin al-Nu'uman and His Sons Sharrkan and Zau al-Makan, and What Befel Them of Things Seld-Seen and Peregrine (46–124)
Tale of Tàj al-Mulúk and the Princess Dunyà: The Lover and the Loved (108–124)
Tale of Azíz and Azízah (113–124)

Volume 3
The Tale of King Omar Bin al-Nu'uman and His Sons Sharrkan and Zau al-Makan (continued) (125–145)
Tale of Tàj al-Mulúk and the Princess Dunyà: The Lover and the Loved (continued) (125–137)
Continuation of the Tale of Aziz and Azizah (125–128)
Tale of the Hashish Eater (143)
Tale of Hammad the Badawi ((144))
The Birds and Beasts and the Carpenter (*146–147)
The Hermits (148)
The Water-Fowl and the Tortoise ((148))
The Wolf and the Fox (149–150)
Tale of the Falcon and the Partridge ((149))
The Mouse and the Ichneumon (151)
The Cat and the Crow ((150))
The Fox and the Crow ((150))
The Flea and the Mouse ((150))
The Saker and the Birds (152)
The Sparrow and the Eagle ((152))
The Hedgehog and the Wood Pigeons ((152))
The Merchant and the Two Sharpers ((152))
The Thief and His Monkey ((152))
The Foolish Weaver ((152))
The Sparrow and the Peacock ((152))
Tale of Ali bin Bakkar and Shams al-Nahar (*153–169)
Tale of Kamar al-Zaman (*170–237)

Volume 4
Tale of Kamar al-Zaman (continued)
Ni'amah bin al-Rabi'a and Naomi His Slave-Girl (238–246)
[Conclusion of the Tale of Kamar al-Zaman] (247–249)
Ala al-Din Abu al-Shamat (250–269)
Hatim of the Tribe of Tayy (270)
Tale of Ma'an the Son of Zaidah (271)
Ma'an the Son of Zaidah and the Badawi
The City of Labtayt (272)
The Caliph Hisham and the Arab Youth
Ibrahim bin al-Mahdi and the Barber-Surgeon (273–275)
The City of Many-Columned Iram and Abdullah Son of Abi Kilabah (276–279)
Isaac of Mosul (280–282)
The Sweep and the Noble Lady (283–285)
The Mock Caliph (286–294)
Ali the Persian (295–296)
Harun al-Rashid and the Slave-Girl and the Imam Abu Yusuf (297)
Tale of the Lover Who Feigned Himself a Thief (298–299)
Ja'afar the Barmecide and the Bean-Seller ((299))
Abu Mohammed hight Lazybones (300–305)
Generous Dealing of Yahya bin Khalid The Barmecide with Mansur (306)
Generous Dealing of Yahya Son of Khalid with a Man Who Forged a Letter in his Name (307)
Caliph Al-Maamun and the Strange Scholar (308)
Ali Shar and Zumurrud (309–327)
The Loves of Jubayr bin Umayr and the Lady Budur (328–334)
The Man of Al-Yaman and His Six Slave-Girls (335–338)
Harun al-Rashid and the Damsel and Abu Nowas (339–340)
The Man Who Stole the Dish of Gold Wherein The Dog Ate (341)
The Sharper of Alexandria and the Chief of Police (342)
Al-Malik al-Nasir and the Three Chiefs of Police (343-344)
The Story of the Chief of Police of Cairo ((343))
The Story of the Chief of the Bulak Police (344)
The Story of the Chief of the Old Cairo Police ((344))
The Thief and the Shroff (345)
The Chief of the Kus Police and the Sharper (346)
Ibrahim bin al-Mahdi and the Merchant's Sister (347)
The Woman whose Hands were Cut Off for Giving Alms to the Poor (348)
The Devout Israelite (349)
Abu Hassan al-Ziyadi and the Khorasan Man (350–351)
The Poor Man and His Friend in Need ((351))
The Ruined Man Who Became Rich Again Through a Dream (352)
Caliph al-Mutawakkil and his Concubine Mahbubah (353)
Wardan the Butcher; His Adventure With the Lady and the Bear (354–355)
The King's Daughter and the Ape (356–357)

Volume 5
The Ebony Horse (358–371)
Uns al-Wujud and the Vizier's Daughter al-Ward Fi'l-Akmam or Rose-In-Hood (372–381)
Abu Nowas With the Three Boys and the Caliph Harun al-Rashid (382–383)
Abdallah bin Ma'amar With the Man of Bassorah and His Slave Girl ((383))
The Lovers of the Banu Ozrah (384)
The Wazir of al-Yaman and His Younger Brother ((384))
The Loves of the Boy and Girl at School (385)
Al-Mutalammis and His Wife Umaymah ((385))
The Caliph Harun al-Rashid and Queen Zubaydah in the Bath (386)
Harun al-Rashid and the Three Poets ((386))
Mus'ab bin al-Zubayr and Ayishah Daughter of Talhah (387)
Abu al-Aswad and His Slave-Girl ((387))
Harun al-Rashid and the Two Slave-Girls ((387))
The Caliph Harun al-Rashid and the Three Slave-Girls ((387))
The Miller and His Wife (388)
The Simpleton and the Sharper ((388))
The Kazi Abu Yusuf With Harun al-Rashid and Queen Zubaydah (389)
The Caliph al-Hakim and the Merchant ((389))
King Kisra Anushirwan and the Village Damsel (390)
The Water-Carrier and the Goldsmith's Wife (391)
Khusrau and Shirin and the Fisherman ((391))
Yahya bin Khalid the Barmecide and the Poor Man (392)
Mohammed al-Amin and the Slave-Girl ((392))
The Sons of Yahya bin Khalid and Sa'id bin Salim al-Bahili (393)
The Woman's Trick Against Her Husband (394)
The Devout Woman and the Two Wicked Elders ((394))
Ja'afar the Barmecide and the Old Badawi (395)
The Caliph Omar bin al-Khattab and the Young Badawi (396–397)
The Caliph al-Maamun and the Pyramids of Egypt (398)
The Thief and the Merchant (399)
Masrur the Eunuch and Ibn al-Karibi (400–401)
The Devotee Prince (402)
The Unwise Schoolmaster Who Fell in Love by Report (403)
The Foolish Dominie ((403))
The Illiterate Who Set Up For a Schoolmaster (404)
The King and the Virtuous Wife ((404))
Abd al-Rahman the Maghribi's Story of the Rukh (405)
Adi bin Zayd and the Princess Hind (406–407)
Di'ibil al-Khuza'i With the Lady and Muslim bin al-Walid ((407))
Isaac of Mosul and the Merchant (408–409)
The Three Unfortunate Lovers (410)
How Abu Hasan Brake Wind (not found in other editions; authenticity disputed) ((410))
The Lovers of the Banu Tayy (411)
The Mad Lover (412)
The Prior Who Became a Moslem (413–414)
The Loves of Abu Isa and Kurrat al-Ayn (415–418)
Al-Amin Son of al-Rashid and His Uncle Ibrahim bin al-Mahdi (419)
Al-Fath bin Khakan and the Caliph Al-Mutawakkil ((419))
The Man's Dispute With the Learned Woman Concerning the Relative Excellence of Male and Female (420–423)
Abu Suwayd and the Pretty Old Woman (424)
The Emir ali bin Tahir and the Girl Muunis ((424))
The Woman Who had a Boy and the Other Who had a Man to Lover ((424))
Ali the Cairene and the Haunted House in Baghdad (425–434)
The Pilgrim Man and the Old Woman (435–436)
Abu al-Husn and His Slave-Girl Tawaddud (437–462)
The Angel of Death With the Proud King and the Devout Man
The Angel of Death and the Rich King (463)
The Angel of Death and the King of the Children of Israel (464)
Iskandar Zu al-Karnayn and a Certain Tribe of Poor Folk
The Righteousness of King Anushirwan (465)
The Jewish Kazi and His Pious Wife (466)
The Shipwrecked Woman and Her Child (467)
The Pious Black Slave (468)
The Devout Tray-Maker and His Wife (469–470)
Al-Hajjaj and the Pious Man (471)
The Blacksmith Who Could Handle Fire Without Hurt (472–473)
The Devotee To Whom Allah Gave a Cloud for Service and the Devout King (474)
The Moslem Champion and the Christian Damsel (475–477)
The Christian King's Daughter and the Moslem (478)
The Prophet and the Justice of Providence (479)
The Ferryman of the Nile and the Hermit
The Island King and the Pious Israelite (480–481)
Abu al-Hasan and Abu Ja'afar the Leper (482)
The Queen of Serpents (483–486)
The Adventures of Bulukiya (487–499)
The Story of Janshah (500–530)
[The Adventures of Bulukiya] resumed (531–533)
[The Queen of Serpents] resumed (534–536)

Volume 6
Sindbad the Seaman and Sindbad the Landsman (537–538)
The First Voyage of Sindbad the Seaman (539–542)
The Second Voyage of Sindbad the Seaman (543–546)
The Third Voyage of Sindbad the Seaman (547–550)
The Fourth Voyage of Sindbad the Seaman (551–556)
The Fifth Voyage of Sindbad the Seaman (557–559)
The Sixth Voyage of Sindbad the Seaman (560–563)
The Seventh Voyage of Sindbad the Seaman (564–566)
[Burton adds an alternative seventh voyage before concluding the Sindbad head story]
The City of Brass (567–578)
The Craft and Malice of Woman, or the Tale of the King, His Son, His Concubine and the Seven Viziers
The King and His Vizier's Wife (579)
The Confectioner, His Wife and the Parrot
The Fuller and His Son (580)
The Rake's Trick Against the Chaste Wife
The Miser and the Loaves of Bread (581)
The Lady and Her Two Lovers
The King's Son and the Ogress (582)
The Drop of Honey
The Woman Who Made Her Husband Sift Dust
The Enchanted Spring (583–584)
The Vizier's Son and the Hammam-Keeper's Wife
The Wife's Device to Cheat her Husband (585–586)
The Goldsmith and the Cashmere Singing-Girl (587)
The Man who Never Laughed During the Rest of His Days (588–591)
The King's Son and the Merchant's Wife (592)
The Page Who Feigned to Know the Speech of Birds (593)
The Lady and Her Five Suitors (594–596)
The Three Wishes, or the Man Who Longed to see the Night of Power
The Stolen Necklace (597)
The Two Pigeons
Prince Behram and the Princess Al-Datma (598)
The House With the Belvedere (599–602)
The King's Son and the Ifrit's Mistress (603)
The Sandal-Wood Merchant and the Sharpers (604–605)
The Debauchee and the Three-Year-Old Child
The Stolen Purse (606)
The Fox and the Folk
Judar and His Brethren (607–624)
The History of Gharib and His Brother Ajib (625–636)

Volume 7
The History of Gharib and His Brother Ajib (continued) (637–680)
Otbah and Rayya (681)
Hind Daughter of Al-Nu'man, and Al-Hajjaj (682–683)
Khuzaymah Bin Bishr and Ikrimah Al-Fayyaz (684)
Yunus the Scribe and the Caliph Walid Bin Sahl (685)
Harun al-Rashid and the Arab Girl (686)
Al-Asma'i and the Three Girls of Bassorah (687)
Ibrahim of Mosul and the Devil (688)
The Lovers of the Banu Uzrah (689–691)
The Badawi and His Wife (692–693)
The Lovers of Bassorah (694–695)
Ishak of Mosul and His Mistress and the Devil (696)
The Lovers of Al-Medinah (697)
Al-Malik Al-Nasir and His Wazir (698)
The Rogueries of Dalilah the Crafty and Her Daughter Zaynab the Coney-Catcher (699–708)
The Adventures of Mercury Ali of Cairo (709–719)
Ardashir and Hayat al-Nufus (720–738)
Julnar the Sea-Born and Her Son King Badr Basim of Persia (739–756)
King Mohammed Bin Sabaik and the Merchant Hasan (757–758)
Story of Prince Sayf al-Muluk and the Princess Badi'a al-Jamal (759–776)

Volume 8
King Mohammed Bin Sabaik and the Merchant Hasan (continued)
Story of Prince Sayf al-Muluk and the Princess Badi'a al-Jamal (continued) (777–778)
Hassan of Bassorah (779–831)
Khalifah The Fisherman Of Baghdad (832–845)
[Alternate version of the same story from the Breslau edition]
Masrur and Zayn al-Mawasif (846–863)
Ali Nur al-Din and Miriam the Girdle-Girl (864–888)

Volume 9
Ali Nur al-Din and Miriam the Girdle-Girl (continued) (889–894)
The Man of Upper Egypt and His Frankish Wife (895–896)
The Ruined Man of Baghdad and his Slave-Girl (897–899)
King Jali'ad of Hind and His Wazir Shimas (900)
The History of King Wird Khan, son of King Jali'ad with His Women and Viziers
The Mouse and the Cat (901–902)
The Fakir and His Jar of Butter (903)
The Fishes and the Crab
The Crow and the Serpent (904)
The Wild Ass and the Jackal (905)
The Unjust King and the Pilgrim Prince (906)
The Crows and the Hawk (907)
The Serpent-Charmer and His Wife (908)
The Spider and the Wind (909)
The Two Kings (910)
The Blind Man and the Cripple (911–918)
The Foolish Fisherman
The Boy and the Thieves (919)
The Man and his Wife (920)
The Merchant and the Robbers (921)
The Jackals and the Wolf
The Shepherd and the Rogue (922–924)
The Francolin and the Tortoises
[The History of King Wird Khan, son of King Jali'ad with His Women and Viziers] resumed (925–930)
Abu Kir the Dyer and Abu Sir the Barber (931–940)
Abdullah the Fisherman and Abdullah the Merman (941–946)
Harun Al-Rashid and Abu Hasan, The Merchant of Oman (947–952)
Ibrahim and Jamilah (953–959)
Abu Al-Hasan of Khorasan (960–963)
Kamar Al-Zaman and the Jeweller's Wife (964–978)
Abdullah bin Fazil and His Brothers (979–989)

Volume 10
Ma'aruf the Cobbler and His Wife Fatimah (990–1001)
Conclusion of Shahrazad and Shahryar

Also included in this volume
Terminal Essay
Preliminary
I. The Origin of The Nights
A. The Birthplace
B. The Date
C. [Authors]
II. The Nights in Europe
III. The Matter and the Manner of The Nights
A. The Matter
B. The Manner of The Nights
IV. Social Condition
A. Al-Islam
B. Woman
C. Pornography
D. Pederasty
V. On the Prose-Rhyme and the Poetry of The Nights
A. The Saj'a
B. The Verse
L'Envoi
Index (for both the remaining tales in this volume and the terminal essay)
Appendices
Memorandum
Appendix I
Index I: Index to the Tales and Proper Names
Index II: Alphabetical Table of the Notes (Anthropological, &c.)
Index IIIA: Alphabetical Table of First Lines (Metrical Portion) in English
Index IIIB: Alphabetical Table of First Lines (Metrical Portion) in Arabic
Index IVA: Table of Contents of the Unfinished Calcutta Edition
Index IVB: Table of Contents of the Breslau (Tunis) Edition
Index IVC: Table of Contents of the MacNaghten or Turner-Macan Text and Bulak Edition
Index IVD: Comparison of the Tables of Contents of the Lane and Burton versions
Appendix II: Contributions to the Bibliography (by W. F. Kirby)
Galland's MS and Translation
Cazotte's Continuation, and the Composite Editions
The Commencement of the Story of Saif Zul Yezn According to Habicht
Scott's MSS and Translations
Weil's Translation
Von Hammer's MS and the Translations Derived from it
Collections of Selected Tales
Separate Editions of Single or Composite Tales
Translations of Cognate Oriental Romances
Dr. Clarke's MS.
Imitations and Miscellaneous Works
Conclusion
Comparative Table of the Tales in the Principal Editions

Supplemental Nights, Volume 1
The material in the first two of the six supplemental volumes are the Arabic tales originally included in the John Payne translation. They are mostly taken from the Breslau edition and the Calcutta fragment.

The Sleeper and the Waker
Story of the Larrikin and the Cook
The Caliph Omar Bin Abd al-Aziz and the Poets
Al-Hajjaj and the Three Young Men
Harun al-Rashid and the Woman of the Barmecides
The Ten Wazirs; or the History of King Azadbakht and His Son
This is a series of stories from the Breslau edition (435–487) in which a youth saves his life by telling stories over eleven days.
Of the Uselessness of Endeavour Against Persistent Ill Fortune
Story of the Merchant Who Lost His Luck
Of Looking To the Ends of Affairs
Tale of the Merchant and His Sons
Of the Advantages of Patience
Story of Abu Sabir
Of the Ill Effects of Impatience
Story of Prince Bihzad
Of the Issues of Good and Evil Actions
Story of King Dadbin and His Wazirs
Of Trust in Allah
Story of King Bakhtzaman
Of Clemency
Story of King Bihkard
Of Envy and Malice
Story of Aylan Shah and Abu Tammam
Of Destiny or That Which Is Written On the Forehead
Story of King Ibrahim and His Son
Of the Appointed Term, Which, if it be Advanced, May Not Be Deferred, and if it be Deferred, May Not Be Advanced
Story of King Sulayman Shah and His Niece
Of the Speedy Relief of Allah
Story of the Prisoner and How Allah Gave Him Relief
Ja'afar Bin Yahya and Abd al-Malik bin Salih the Abbaside
Al-Rashid and the Barmecides
Breslau (567)
Ibn al-Sammak and al-Rashid
Al-Maamum and Zubaydah
Al-Nu'uman and the Arab of the Banu Tay
Breslau (660–661)
Firuz and His Wife
Breslau (675–676)
King Shah Bakht and his Wazir Al-Rahwan
Breslau (875–930); a wazir accused of plotting to kill the king saves himself by telling tales each night for a month (28 days).
Tale of the Man of Khorasan, His Son and His Tutor
Tale of the Singer and the Druggist
Tale of the King Who Kenned the Quintessence of Things
Tale of the Richard Who Married His Beautiful Daughter to the Poor Old Man
Tale of the Sage and His Three Sons
Tale of the Prince who Fell in Love With the Picture
Tale of the Fuller and His Wife and the Trooper
Tale of the Merchant, The Crone, and the King
Tale of the Simpleton Husband
Tale of the Unjust King and the Tither
Story of David and Solomon
Tale of the Robber and the Woman
Tale of the Three Men and Our Lord Isa
The Disciple's Story
Tale of the Dethroned Ruler Whose Reign and Wealth Were Restored to Him
Talk of the Man Whose Caution Slew Him
Tale of the Man Who Was Lavish of His House and His Provision to One Whom He Knew Not
Tale of the Melancholist and the Sharper
Tale of Khalbas and his Wife and the Learned Man
Tale of the Devotee Accused of Lewdness
Tale of the Hireling and the Girl
Tale of the Weaver Who Became a Leach by Order of His Wife
Tale of the Two Sharpers Who Each Cozened His Compeer
Tale of the Sharpers With the Shroff and the Ass
Tale of the Chear and the Merchants
Story of the Falcon and the Locust
Tale of the King and His Chamberlain's Wife
Story of the Crone and the Draper's Wife
Tale of the Ugly Man and His Beautiful Wife
Tale of the King Who Lost Kingdom and Wife and Wealth and Allah Restored Them to Him
Tale of Salim the Youth of Khorasan and Salma, His Sister
Tale of the King of Hind and His Wazir
Shahrazad and Shahryar, [an extract from the Breslau edition].

Supplemental Nights, Volume 2
Al-Malik al-Zahir Rukn al-Din Bibars al-Bundukdari and the Sixteen Captains of Police
Breslau (930–940)
First Constable's History
Second Constable's History
Third Constable's History
Fourth Constable's History
Fifth Constable's History
Sixth Constable's History
Seventh Constable's History
Eighth Constable's History
The Thief's Tale
Ninth Constable's History
Tenth Constable's History
Eleventh Constable's History
Twelfth Constable's History
Thirteenth Constable's History
Fourteenth Constable's History
A Merry Jest of a Clever Thief
Tale of the Old Sharper
Fifteenth Constable's History
Sixteenth Constable's History
Tale of Harun al-Rashid and Abdullah bin Nafi'
Breslau (941–957)
Tale of the Damsel Torfat al-Kulub and the Caliph Harun al-Rashid
To this tale Burton added an extensive footnote about circumcision.
Women's Wiles
Calcutta edition (196–200)
Nur al-Din Ali of Damascus and the Damsel Sitt al-Milah
Breslau (958–965)
Tale of King Ins bin Kays and His Daughter with the Son of King Al-'Abbas
Breslau (966–979)
Alternate ending from the Breslau edition of tale of Shahrazad and Shahryar, with the remaining tales being told after night 1001
Tale of the Two kings and the Wazir's Daughters
The Concubine and the Caliph
The Concubine of Al-Maamun

In the remainder of this volume W. A. Clouston presents "variants and analogues" of the supplemental nights.
The Sleeper and the Waker
The Ten Wazirs; or the History of King Azadbakht and His Son
King Dadbin and His Wazirs
King Aylan Shah and Abu Tamman
King Sulayman Shah and His Niece
Firuz and His Wife
King Shah Bakht and His Wazir Al-Rahwan
On the Art of Enlarging Pearls
The Singer and the Druggist
Persian version
Ser Giovanni's version
Straparola's version
The King Who Kenned the Quintessence of Things
Indian version
Siberian version
Hungarian version
Turkish analogue
The Prince Who Fell In Love With the Picture
The Fuller, His Wife, and the Trooper
The Simpleton Husband
The Three Men and our Lord Isa
The Melancholist and the Sharper
The Devout Woman accused of Lewdness
The Weaver Who Became A Leach By Order of His Wife
The King Who Lost Kingdom, Wife, and Wealth
Kashmiri version
Panjàbí version
Tibetan version
Legend of St. Eustache
Old English "Gesta" version
Romance of Sir Isumbras
Al-Malik al-Zahir and the Sixteen Captains of Police
The Thief's Tale
The Ninth Constable's Story
The Fifteenth Constable's Story
The Damsel Tuhfat al-Kulub
Women's Wiles
Nur al-Din and the Damsel Sitt al-Milah
King Ins Bin Kays and his Daughter
Additional Notes
Firuz and His Wife
The Singer and the Druggist
The Fuller, His Wife, and the Trooper

Supplemental Nights, Volume 3
This volume is based primarily on tales found in a Bibliothèque nationale manuscript (Supplement Arab. No.2523) which was used by Antoine Galland.  The nights indicated overlap with those given in Burton's main series.  The Table of Contents in this covers this and the following volume.

Foreword
The Tale of Zayn al-Asnam (497–513)
Turkish version
Alāʼ ad-Dīn and The Wonderful Lamp (514–591)
English translation of Galland
Khudadad and His Brothers (592–595)
History of the Princess of Daryabar (596–599)
[Khudadad and His Brothers] resumed (600–604)
The Caliph's Night Adventure (605–606)
The Story of the Blind Man, Baba Abdullah (607–611)
History of Sidi Nu'uman (612–615)
History of Khwajah Hasan al-Habbal (616–625)
Ali Baba and the Forty Thieves (626–638)
Ali Khwajah and the Merchant of Baghdad (639–643)
Prince Ahmad and the Fairy Peri-Banu (644–667)
The Two Sisters Who Envied Their Cadette (668–688)

Appendix
Variants and Analogues of the Tales in the Supplemental Nights, by W. A. Clouston
The Tale of Zayn al-Asnam
Aladdin; or, The Wonderful Lamp
Khudadad and his Brothers
The Story of the Blind Man, Baba Abdullah
History of Sidi Nu'uman
History of Khwajah Hasan al-Habbal
Ali Baba and the Forty Thieves
Ali Khwajah and the Merchant of Baghdad
Prince Ahmad and the Peri-Banu
The Two Sisters Who Envied Their Cadette
Modern Arabic version
Kaba'il version
Modern Greek version
Albanian version
Italian version
Breton version
German version
Icelandic version
Bengalí version
Buddhist version
Additional notes
The Tale of Zayn al-Asnam
Aladdin; or, The Wonderful Lamp
Ali Baba and the Forty Thieves
The Tale of Prince Ahmad

Supplemental Nights, Volume 4
The stories in this volume are based on the Wortley Montague Codex in the Bodleian Library, originally used for the Jonathan Scott translation.  No explanation has been found regarding the nights that do not appear.
Translator's Foreword
Story of the Sultan of Al-Yaman and His Three Sons (330–334)
Story of the Three Sharpers (335–342)
The Sultan Who Fared Forth in the Habit of a Darwaysh (343)
History of Mohammed, Sultan of Cairo (344–348)
Story of the First Lunatic (349–354)
Story of the Second Lunatic (355–357)
Story of the Sage and the Scholar (358–361)
The Night-Adventure of Sultan Mohammed of Cairo with the Three Foolish Schoolmasters (362)
Story of the Broke-Back Schoolmaster (363)
Story of the Split-Mouthed Schoolmaster (364)
Story of the Limping Schoolmaster (365)
[The Night-Adventure of Sultan Mohammed of Cairo] resumed (366)
Story of the Three Sisters and Their Mother the Sultanah (367–385)
History of the Kazi Who Bare a Babe (387–392)
Tale of the Kazi and the Bhang-Eater (393–397)
History of the Bhang-Eater and His Wife (398–400)
How Drummer Abu Kasim Became a Kazi (401)
Story of the Kazi and His Slipper (402–403)
[Tale of the Kazi and the Bhang-Eater] resumed (404–412)
Tale of Mahmud the Persian and the Kurd Sharper (417)
Tale of the Sultan and His Sons and the Enchanting Bird (418–425)
Story of the King of Al-Yaman and His Three Sons and the Enchanting Bird (427, 429, 430, 432, 433, 435, 437, 438) (sic!)
History of the First Larrikin (441–443)
History of the Second Larrikin (445)
History of the Third Larrikin (447)
Story of a Sultan of Al-Hind and His Son Mohammed (449, 452, 455, 457, 459)
Tale of the Fisherman and His Son (461, 463, 465, 467, 469)
Tale of the Third Larrikin Concerning Himself (471)
History of Abu Niyyah and Abu Niyyatayn (473, 475, 477, 479, 480)
Appendices
A: Ineptiæ Bodleianæ
B: The Three Untranslated Tales in Mr. E. J. W. Gibb's "Forty Vezirs"
The Thirty-eighth Vezir's Story
The Fortieth Vezir's story
The Lady's Thirty-fourth Story

Supplemental Nights, Volume 5
This volume continues material from the Wortley Montague Codex

Translator's Foreword
The History of the King's Son of Sind and the Lady Fatimah (495, 497, 499)
History of the Lovers of Syria (503, 505, 507, 509)
History of Al-Hajjaj Bin Yusuf and the Young Sayyid (512, 514, 516, 518)
Night Adventure of Harun al-Rashid and the Youth Manjab
The Loves of the Lovers of Bassorah (in volume 7 of The Nights)
[Night Adventure of Harun al-Rashid and the Youth Manjab] resumed (634, 636, 638, 640, 642, 643, 645, 646, 648, 649, 651)
Story of the Darwaysh and the Barber's Boy and the Greedy Sultan (653, 655)
Tale of the Simpleton Husband (656)
Note Concerning the "Tirrea Bede" (655)
The Loves of Al-Hayfa and Yusuf (663, 665, 667, 670, 672, 674, 676, 678, 680, 682, 684, 686, 687, 689, 691, 693, 694, 696, 698, 700, 702, 703, 705, 707, 709)
The Three Princes of China (711, 712, 714, 716)
The Righteous Wazir Wrongfully Gaoled (729, 731, 733)
The Cairene Youth, the Barber and the Captain (735, 737)
The Goodwife of Cairo and Her Four Gallants (739, 741)
The Tailor and the Lady and the Captain (743, 745)
The Syrian and the Three Women of Cairo (747)
The Lady With Two Coyntes (751)
The Whorish Wife Who Vaunted Her Virtue (754, 755)
Cœlebs the Droll and His Wife and Her Four Lovers (758, 760)
The Gatekeeper of Cairo and the Cunning She-Thief (761, 763, 765)
Tale of Mohsin and Musa (767, 769, 771)
Mohammed the Shalabi and His Mistress and His Wife (774, 776, 777)
The Fellah and His Wicked Wife (778–779)
The Woman Who Humoured Her Lover At Her Husband's Expense (781)
The Kazi Schooled By His Wife (783, 785)
The Merchant's Daughter and the Prince of Al-Irak (787, 790, 793, 795, 797, 799, 801, 803, 805, 807, 808, 810, 812, 814, 817, 819, 821, 823)
Story of the Youth Who Would Futter His Father's Wives (832–836)
Story of the Two Lack-Tacts of Cairo and Damascus (837–840)
Tale of Himself Told By the King (912–917)
Appendix I - Catalogue of Wortley Montague Manuscript Contents
Appendix II
Notes on the Stories Contained in Vol IV of "Supplemental Nights", by W. F. Kirby
Notes on the Stories Contained in Vol V of "Supplemental Nights", by W. F. Kirby

Supplemental Nights, Volume 6
Stories from a manuscript in the possession of the Syrian scholar Dom Chavis.

The Say of Haykar the Sage
The History of Al-Bundukani or, the Caliph Harun Al-Rashid and the Daughter of King Kisra
The Linguist-Dame, The Duenna and the King's Son
The Tale of the Warlock and the Young Cook of Baghdad
The Pleasant History of the Cock and the Fox
History of What Befel the Fowl-let with the Fowler
The Tale of Attaf
History of Prince Habib and What Befel Him With the Lady Durrat Al-Ghawwas
The History of Durrat Al-Ghawwas

See also

List of characters within One Thousand and One Nights

References
List from Wollamshram World

One Thousand and One Nights
One Thousand and One Nights
Love stories